Åby is a locality situated in Norrköping Municipality, Östergötland County, Sweden with 4,980 inhabitants in 2010.

The locality's name means "village on a river" (Old Norse á, river, and býr, village) and is identical in meaning with Aby in Lincolnshire, England.

Sports
The following sports clubs are located in Åby:

 Åby IF
 Åby Oilers
 Hultic BK

References 

Populated places in Östergötland County
Populated places in Norrköping Municipality